Edy-Nicolas Boyom (born 12 December 1988) is a Cameroonian footballer who plays as a defender.

Boyom began playing football with Sable FC, captaining the side during the 2009 Elite One season. Boyom played abroad in Angola with C.R.D. Libolo, and despite signing a contract to play in Portugal with Moreirense F.C. he returned to Libolo before appearing for the club.

References

External links

1988 births
Living people
People from East Region (Cameroon)
Association football defenders
Cameroonian footballers
Cameroonian expatriate footballers
Sable FC players
C.R.D. Libolo players
AEL Limassol players
Al-Watani Club players
Luftëtari Gjirokastër players
KS Kastrioti players
Saudi First Division League players
Expatriate footballers in Angola
Expatriate footballers in Cyprus
Expatriate footballers in Albania
Cameroonian expatriate sportspeople in Albania
Expatriate footballers in Saudi Arabia